The Downtown Woodland Historic District is a historic district in Woodland, California. It is a California Historical Landmark and is listed as a historic district on the National Register of Historic Places.

Contributing properties
Historic district contributing properties include:
Hotel Woodland
Porter Building
Woodland Opera House
Woodland Public Library
The Jackson Building

See also
California Historical Landmarks in Yolo County, California
National Register of Historic Places listings in Yolo County, California
Index: Historic districts in California

References

Woodland, California
Historic districts on the National Register of Historic Places in California
History of Yolo County, California
Geography of Yolo County, California
National Register of Historic Places in Yolo County, California